1976 JSL Cup Final was the first final of the JSL Cup competition. The final was played at National Stadium in Tokyo on May 14, 1976. Hitachi won the championship.

Overview
Hitachi won their 1st title, by defeating Eidai 1–0.

Match details

See also
1976 JSL Cup

References

JSL Cup
1976 in Japanese football
Kashiwa Reysol matches